The Best of George Jones is an album by American country music artist George Jones.  It is notable for including two new songs, including "The Door," which became a #1 country hit. It was released in March 1975.

Background
Although a plethora of "greatest hits" packages had been released under Jones' name on Mercury, United Artists, and Musicor, The Best of George Jones was the first compilation of his hits with Epic and his new producer Billy Sherrill.  The release may have been prompted by the turmoil in the singer's personal life; his third marriage to Tammy Wynette had ended in divorce earlier in the year and his own erratic behaviour, spurred on by a legendary drinking problem, was worsening.  However, he had scored his first #1 hit in seven years with "The Grand Tour" and followed this with a second chart topper, "The Door," which became the opening track on The Best of George Jones.  Another single written by Jones and Wynette, "These Days (I Barely Get By)," was also released as a single and reached #10.  The album cover features a photograph of Jones as a child busking on the streets of Beaumont.

Track listing
"The Door" (Billy Sherrill, Norro Wilson)
"These Days (I Barely Get By)" (George Jones, Tammy Wynette)
"A Picture of Me (Without You)" (George Richey, Wilson)
"The Grand Tour" (Wilson, Richey, Carmol Taylor)
"We Can Make It" (Sherrill, Glenn Sutton)
"The Weatherman" (Wilson, Richey, Taylor)
"Loving You Could Never Be Better" (Earl Montgomery)
"What My Woman Can't Do" (Jones, Sherrill, Montgomery)
"Once You've Had the Best" (Johnny Paycheck)
"Nothing Ever Hurt Me (Half as Bad as Losing You)" (Bobby Braddock)

References

1975 greatest hits albums
George Jones compilation albums
Albums produced by Billy Sherrill
Epic Records compilation albums